"Because the Night" is a rock song written by Bruce Springsteen and Patti Smith that was first released in 1978 as a single from the Patti Smith Group album, Easter. This version rose to No. 13 on the Billboard Hot 100 chart, as well as No. 5 in the United Kingdom, and helped propel sales of Easter to mainstream success.

The song has subsequently been covered by numerous artists, and at least two of these cover versions have been chart hits. A 1992 version of the song by Co.Ro was a hit in several countries in Europe and South America. It reached No. 1 in Spain and the Top 10 in Belgium, France, Greece and Italy. The following year, a live acoustic version was recorded by 10,000 Maniacs for MTV Unplugged. This recording reached No. 11 on the Billboard Hot 100, making it the highest charting version of the song in the U.S.

In 1987, the song was ranked No. 116 on NME magazine's list of "The Top 150 Singles of All Time". It remains the best-known song of Smith's catalog. In 2021, Rolling Stone ranked it No. 358 on "Top 500 Greatest Songs of All Time". The Independent listed the song as one of the ten best new wave singles of 1978.

History
Bruce Springsteen and the E Street Band recorded "Because the Night" at Atlantic Studios, New York on June 1, 1977, the first day of sessions for Darkness on the Edge of Town, though the lyrics only consisted of the song title and some mumbling. Springsteen struggled with the song for almost four months until his engineer, Jimmy Iovine, got involved. At the time, Iovine was also producing the album Easter for Patti Smith at the Record Plant in New York, where Darkness was also being recorded.

Iovine says, "Now, Bruce was very understanding and very flexible, because he realized that this was my first real break as a producer. Anyway, one night whilst we were lounging around the Hotel Navarro in New York I told Bruce I desperately wanted a hit with Patti, that she deserved one. He agreed. As he had no immediate plans to put 'Because the Night' on an album, I said why not give it to Patti. Bruce replied, 'If she can do it, she can have it.'"

Springsteen later admitted he was not satisfied with the song, and he already knew he was not going to finish it since it was "a[nother] love song". Iovine brought Smith the last recording by Springsteen, from September 27, 1977. Smith added her own lyrics, recorded it, and scored her biggest hit single.

The song was first performed live at a Patti Smith concert at CBGB in New York City on December 30, 1977 (Smith's 31st birthday),  with Springsteen joining on vocals and guitar. Though it was never released on any of Springsteen's studio albums, in concert beginning with his Darkness Tour Springsteen would often perform the song with his own lyrics.

The only two commercially released recordings of a Springsteen version of the song were in the 1986 box set Live/1975–85, in which Smith is listed as co-writer; and the 2010 compilation album The Promise (using the original recording from the Darkness on the Edge of Town sessions with Smith's lyrics).

Charts and certifications

Weekly charts

Year-end charts

Certifications

CO.RO version

In 1992, Italian dance act CO.RO released a version that sold over 660,000 copies. It also samples the Depeche Mode song "Master and Servant" and was a hit in Europe, becoming gold record in France and reaching number-one in Spain. Additionally the single peaked within the top 10 in Belgium, France, Greece and Italy. On the Eurochart Hot 100, "Because the Night" reached number 15 in February 1993. It was also successful in Brazil, and became a big opening of a Eurodance explosion in the 1990s.

Critical reception
The song received favorable reviews from music critics. Larry Flick from Billboard wrote that it "gets a rave/pop treatment" and "urgent vocals by Tarlisa swerve around a looped sample from Depeche Mode's "Master & Servant"." He stated that it "ultimately works well and is better than many of the other covers". Alan Jones from Music Week gave it three out of five. He complimented the song as "actually quite endearing", adding that it combines DM samples with "a maverick bassline and a Smith soundalike. It could click."

Track listing
CD single – Europe (1992)
 "Because the Night" (T.L.S. Radio Mix) – 4:32
 "Because the Night" (T.L.S. Mix) – 5:20
 "It's a Love" (T.S.F. Mix) – 3:40
 "Because the Night" (Dub Mix) – 5:20

Charts

10,000 Maniacs version

An acoustic version was recorded by 10,000 Maniacs in 1993 for MTV Unplugged, with a few lyrical alterations. The recording gained considerable radio airplay and reached No. 11 on the Billboard Hot 100. The cover reached the top 10 in Canada and Iceland, reaching No. 10 and No. 7, respectively. A live version with lead vocalist Mary Ramsey was also included on their 2016 album Playing Favorites.

Track listing
CD single – US (1993)
 "Because the Night" (Live version) – 3:28 	
 "Stockton Gala Days" (Live version) – 5:25

Charts

Weekly charts

Year-end charts

Cascada version

In 2008, Cascada recorded a version which appears on their second album Perfect Day. The music video for the single premiered on YouTube on May 28, 2008. The single was released on July 18, 2008, in Germany.

Track listing 
CD single – Germany (2008)
 "Because the Night" – 3:26
 "Because the Night" (Original Mix) – 5:32
 "Because the Night" (Mondo Remix) – 5:58
 "Because the Night" (2-4 Grooves remix) – 5:45
 "Because the Night" (The Hitmen remix) – 5:49
 "Because the Night" (Manian Bootleg Cut) – 5:04
 "Because the Night" (Manox remix) – 6:19

CD single - UK (2008)
 "Because the Night" – 3:26
 "Because the Night" (Original Mix) – 5:32
 "Because the Night" (Styles & Breeze Remix) – 6:15
 "Because the Night" (Riffs & Rays Remix) – 6:27
 "Because the Night" (Hypasonic Remix) – 5:34
 "Because the Night" (Hitmen Remix) – 5:49
 "Because the Night" (Manox remix) – 6:19

Chart performance

Release history

Garbage and Screaming Females version

In early 2013, Garbage and Screaming Females recorded a cover of "Because the Night" for an exclusive vinyl release on that year's Record Store Day; an annual celebration of independent record stores. Garbage had released two singles ("Blood for Poppies" and "Battle in Me") to mark the 2012 event, and were keen to release "something special" for the following year. The band decided to record "Because the Night" with Screaming Females following some well-received duets of the track at live dates during their North American tour. Marissa Paternoster of Screaming Females originally suggested covering "Because the Night" live. "We thought it'd be the perfect opportunity to solidify a recording and do something really special for the fans and for all the independent record stores," Garbage frontwoman Shirley Manson told Billboard.

Screaming Females flew from their base in New Jersey to Los Angeles to record the track with Garbage, who had set up two complete sets of instruments in EastWest Studios for the session. Garbage drummer Butch Vig told NME: "We did it old-school style. They came out to Hollywood and we went into a big tracking room and recorded Phil Spector style... We cut it live and did very few overdubs, did everything in a day and it came out pretty great. Marissa plays, I think, a 48-bar guitar solo at the end, that girl can shred like Eddie Van Halen, no kidding."

Garbage used social media to raise awareness of the release, and to Record Store Day in general. The band shot a video where they professed their love for independent stores, and stated their earliest memories of shopping in them, while Manson wrote a statement about the importance of the continued existence of these stores, and of vinyl records: "In a world like ours, where we live increasingly isolated lives behind the lonely glow of our computer screens, Record Store Day reminds us all that an independent record store is worth protecting and fighting for. They are a haven and a harbour for all curious and wandering souls." Manson also tipped her hat to Patti Smith in the run-up to RSD 2013: "She is absolutely, without a doubt, one of my greatest inspirations. When I think I can't do things, I think about her and what she's achieved and what she continues to achieve on her own terms—always. That really inspires me. I don't know if she's aware of the cover we're releasing, or if she's aware that I covered "Kimberly" with Angelfish."

"Because the Night" was pressed to a "Coke bottle-green" 10-inch vinyl and backed with "Love Like Suicide" and a fan remix of the album's opening track "Automatic Systematic Habit". An original Garbage song, "Love Like Suicide" had been previously released as bonus track exclusive to the Japan pressing of Not Your Kind of People. Manson explained the song's inclusion to MySpace: "We're releasing it now because we wanted to give a nice gift for the fans." The remix of "Automatic..." was produced by Garbage fan Konstantin Khazev and won first prize in an amateur remix competition held through the Beatport website in 2012. The RSD package was limited to 5,000 units, with the sleeve artwork created by Marissa Paternoster.

The release of "Because the Night" in the United Kingdom was delayed due to problems with the record's distributor. The band made a statement via social media the evening before Record Store Day: "We are so pissed off and disappointed about this. And so sad that on Record Store Day in the UK our little jewel will not be available for sale." The UK release of "Because the Night" was rescheduled to May 13, 2013. The single debuted at number 100 on the Physical Singles chart, before shooting up to number 4 the following week.

On May 7, 2013, Garbage issued a digital single of "Because the Night" in the United States, which was followed a week later by an international digital release.

"Because the Night" would later be included on the deluxe edition bonus disc of Garbage's seventh album, No Gods No Masters and Screaming Females compilation album Singles Too.

Music video
While Garbage and Screaming Females recorded at EastWest Studios, Sophie Muller shot black and white footage to document the sessions. On March 4, 2013, a teaser video was released to YouTube featuring clips of the band members. The full music video was subsequently released on April 17; ahead of Record Store Day.

Critical reception
The cover version of "Because the Night" was positively received by contemporary music critics in advance of Record Store Day. Billboard magazine's Hilary Hughes stated, "...the Garbage/Screaming Females release embodies the shifts brought on by Record Store Day that impact the music industry across the board-and the shaping trends that have fueled Record Store Day's meteoric rise from a community experiment to an international movement," referencing the pairing of artists and the independent label of release. Chris Martins of Spin wrote, "...the bands gel awesomely. The highlight comes when Paternoster starts to shred. We have a feeling Miss Smith will be proud."

Track listing
10-inch Record Store Day release (STNVOL-007)

 "Because the Night" – 4:55
 "Automatic Systematic Habit" (Costa Cadeu remix) – 4:38
 "Love Like Suicide" – 3:51

Digital Single

 "Because the Night" – 4:55

Release history

Other cover versions
Glam metal band Keel recorded the song in 1986 on their sophomore album, The Final Frontier.
 German DJ Jan Wayne released a dance version in 2002 that reached number 14 on the UK Singles Chart, number 2 in Belgium and number one on the Dutch Single Top 100.
 In 2010, Springsteen performed the song on Late Night with Jimmy Fallon, accompanied by bandmates Steven Van Zandt, Roy Bittan and the Roots.
 A cover by synthwave band The Midnight, featuring Nikki Flores, is included as the last track of the band's EP Horror Show, released on 2021.
 AudioPerfecta Cover vs Original – Because the Night, comparison of four versions by Aaron J Edwards (2018)

References

External links
 Because the Night by Patti Smith at AllMusic
 

1978 singles
1992 debut singles
1993 singles
2008 singles
Bruce Springsteen songs
Patti Smith songs
10,000 Maniacs songs
Songs written by Bruce Springsteen
Songs written by Patti Smith
Live singles
Rock ballads
1970s ballads
Eurodance songs
Garbage (band) songs
Music videos directed by Sophie Muller
1977 songs
Song recordings produced by Jimmy Iovine
Arista Records singles
ZYX Music singles
Elektra Records singles
Number-one singles in Spain